"Face to Face" is a ballad performed by Barry Gibb and Olivia Newton-John. It was released as a promotional single from Gibb's 1984 album Now Voyager in Brazil, Germany, Philippines and Spain. It was also included on Newton-John's compilation Love Songs (2004, Japan exclusive). Face to Face was also included in Olivia Newton-John's 3-Disc CD reissue of Physical-2021 Remastered Deluxe Edition.

It is one of the two songs on the album along with "She Says" that was not featured on the 1984 film Now Voyager starring Gibb himself and Michael Hordern.

Background
It was written by Gibb, along with Maurice Gibb and George Bitzer in 1983. The solo version of "Face to Face" was recorded by Gibb as a demo in late 1983 with his brother Maurice (guitar, bass, synthesizer) and Bitzer (piano, synthesizer) along with four other songs.

"Face to Face" is almost a Newton-John's record with support from Gibb. Gibb and Newton-John also provides harmony vocals. Near the end of the song, Gibb is heard singing his trademark falsetto from 1975.

Newton-John also contributed background vocals on "Fine Line", a song also included on Gibb's Now Voyager.

Critical reception
Allmusic critic William Ruhlmann called "Face to Face" as "a steamy ballad duet with Newton-John that wouldn't have been out of place on Guilty and might have a good single".

References

1984 singles
Barry Gibb songs
Songs written by Barry Gibb
Songs written by Maurice Gibb
Olivia Newton-John songs
Song recordings produced by Barry Gibb
Male–female vocal duets
Polydor Records singles
MCA Records singles
1980s ballads
1984 songs